Bu Athla is a small town in northern Libya.

Populated places in Al Wahat District